Hird is a surname. Notable people with the surname include:

Allan Hird (disambiguation), multiple people
Harold Hird (born 1942), Australian politician
Harry Hird (1896–1974), English footballer
James Hird (born 1973), Australian rules footballer
Thora Hird (1911–2003), English actress and comedian of stage and screen, presenter and writer